XK (also known as Kell blood group precursor) is a protein found on human red blood cells and other tissues which is responsible for the Kx antigen which helps determine a person's blood type.

Clinical significance
The Kx antigen plays a role in matching blood for blood transfusions.

Mutation of XK protein may lead to McLeod syndrome, a multi-system disorder characterized by hemolytic anemia, myopathy, acanthocytosis, and chorea.

XK is located on the X chromosome (cytogenetic band Xp21.1) and absence of the XK protein is an X-linked disease.

Function
XK is a membrane transport protein of unknown action.

References

External links 
  GeneReviews/NCBI/NIH/UW entry on McLeod Neuroacanthocytosis Syndrome
 XK at BGMUT Blood Group Antigen Gene Mutation Database at NCBI, NIH
 

Blood antigen systems
Transfusion medicine